Gelechia lactiflora is a moth of the family Gelechiidae first described by Edward Meyrick in 1921. It is found in Mozambique.

The wingspan is about 11 mm. The forewings are ochreous white with a black basal fascia occupying about one-sixth of the wing, confluent towards the costa with an oblique black fasciate patch from the costa, extending on the costa to two-fifths, and reaching two-thirds of the way across the wing. There is a transverse trapezoidal black blotch from the costa beyond the middle, widest beneath and connected with the preceding in the disc, the lower posterior angle projecting as a lobe nearly to the tornus and with a few blackish scales along the costa between this and the preceding. There are one or two black scales at the apex. The hindwings are whitish grey.

References

Endemic fauna of Mozambique
Moths described in 1921
Gelechia